Ernesto Tisdel Lefevre de la Ossa (1876–1922) was a Panamanian politician.

He was elected as the third presidential designate by the National Assembly for the term 1918-1920. In that capacity he became the President of Panama from January 1920 to October 1920.

References

1876 births
1922 deaths
Presidents of Panama
Vice presidents of Panama